Panquetzaliztli   is the name of the fifteenth month of the Aztec calendar. It is also a festival  in the Aztec religion dedicated to Huitzilopochtli.
The correlation of Rafael Tena places the 20-day month last from November 30 to December 19.

References

Aztec calendars
Aztec mythology and religion